M.P. Abdussamad Samadani (born 1 January 1959) is an Indian politician, orator, writer and scholar. He knows  Malayalam, English, Urdu, Hindi, Arabic, Persian and Sanskrit languages. Samadani was awarded Doctor of Philosophy degree from Jawaharlal Nehru University, New Delhi.

Personal life 
M.P. Abdussamad Samadani was born as son of M.P. Abdul Hameed Haidari and Ottakath Zainab on 1 January 1959 at Kottakkal, Malappuram district.

Education 
Samadani holds a Bachelor of Arts with First Rank, Master of Arts with Second Rank from Farook College in 1982, and M. Phil. from University of Calicut in 1986, LLB from Government Law College, Kozhikode in 2003. He did his PhD from Jawaharlal Nehru University, New Delhi.

Political career 
Samadani is a two time Parliament member (Rajya Sabha: 1994-2000, 2000-2006). He was a member of Kerala Legislative Assembly (Kottakkal constituency) from 2011 to 2016. He was nominated as the Convenor of the Parliamentary Sub-committee on Universities and Higher Education and  Member of Central Advisory Board of Education, Government of India.  He was also  a member of India’s official and parliamentary delegations to Saudi Arabia, Egypt, Syria and Jordan, appointed by the Union government. He also worked as a member of Kerala Sahitya Academy and Kerala Kalamandalam. He was elected as Member of parliament, Lok Sabha representing Malappuram (Lok Sabha constituency) through by - election held in 2021.

As an orator
Samadani has translated the speeches of Manmohan Singh, Soniya Gandhi, Rahul Gandhi, Farooq Abdullah, Gulam Nabi Azad, Kapil Sibal, Mani Shankar Aiyar, Mulayam Singh Yadav, Nitish Kumar, Karan Singh, Gulzar, Raj Babbar, Maulana Abul Hasan Ali Hasani Nadwi, Arjun Singh, Kuldip Nayar, Pandit Jasraj, Ali Sardar Jafri, and Padmashree Shamsur Rahman Faruqi. Shri M. T. Vasudevan Nair called him ‘Vashya Vachassu’ (The Enchanting Word).

Positions held

1994 – Elected to Rajya Sabha, the Upper House of Indian Parliament
2000 – Re-elected to Rajya Sabha
2002 to 2004 – Convener, Parliamentary Sub-Committee on Universities and Higher Education
2004 – Member, Central Advisory Board of Education, Government of India
2004 – Member, Parliamentary Committee on Health and Family Welfare
1995 to 1996 – Member, Parliamentary Committee on Defence
1996 to 1999 – Member, Parliamentary Committee on Subordinate Legislation
1996 to 2004 and 2004 to 2006 – Member, Parliamentary Committee on Human Resource Development
1996 to 2004 and 2004 to 2006 – Member, Consultative Committee for the Ministry of External Affairs
1998 to 1999 and 2004 to 2006 – Member, Parliamentary Committee on Papers Laid on the Table, Member, Papers Laid on the Table Parliamentary Committee
2001 - Member, Court of the Aligarh Muslim University
Member, Malappuram District Council
Member, Kerala Sahitya Academy
Member, Kerala Kalamandalam
Senior Vice President, Indian Union Muslim League
 Director, Indianness Academy
Chairman, Maulana Azad Foundation
 Chairman, Sukumar Azhikode Foundation
 Patron, Kerala Sanskrit Prachara Samithi
 President, Anjuman Tarqi-e-Urdu, Kerala Branch
Member of Kerala Legislative Assembly from Kottakkal assembly constituency 2011–2016.
Member of Lok Sabha from Malappuram Constituency 2021 - Incumbent

See also 

 Syed Muhammedali Shihab Thangal
 Indian Union Muslim League

References

External links 
 Stress on humanitarian values
 A website on Indian Union Muslim League

Malayali politicians
People from Malappuram district
Living people
1959 births
Indian Union Muslim League politicians
Rajya Sabha members from Kerala